Freddy Walker (born 26 July 1994) is a New Zealand cricketer. He played in three List A matches for Northern Districts in 2017 and 2018. He made his List A debut for Northern Districts on 15 January 2017 in the 2016–17 Ford Trophy. He made his Twenty20 debut on 1 January 2021, for Northern Districts in the 2020–21 Super Smash. He made his first-class debut on 29 March 2022, for Northern Districts in the 2021–22 Plunket Shield season.

See also
 List of Northern Districts representative cricketers

References

External links
 

1994 births
Living people
New Zealand cricketers
Northern Districts cricketers
Cricketers from Hamilton, New Zealand